Dear America is a series of historical fiction novels for children published by Scholastic starting in 1996. By 1998, the series had 12 titles with 3.5 million copies in print. The series was canceled in 2004 with its final release, Hear My Sorrow. However, it was relaunched in the fall of 2010. Each book is written in the form of a diary of a young woman's life during important events or time periods in American history. The Dear America series covers a wide range of topics, including: the Pilgrims' journey to the New World, the Salem Witch Trials, the French and Indian War, the American Revolution, the American Civil War, World War I, World War II, western expansion, slavery, immigration, nineteenth-century prairie life, the California Gold Rush of 1849, the Great Depression, Native Americans' experiences, racism, coal mining, the Triangle Shirtwaist Factory fire, the fight for women's suffrage, the sinking of the RMS Titanic, the Battle of the Alamo, the Vietnam War, and more.  The breadth of historical topics covered in these books through fiction makes the Dear America series a favorite teaching device of history schoolteachers around the country. The re-launch series and releases contain a new cover style and different pictures of the main characters than those of the original releases. Originally all the books had a ribbon inserted as a bookmark for the books but were removed in the later releases. Several of the stories were filmed and released on videotape.

Original series
There are thirty-six books in the original Dear America series:

A Journey to the New World: The Diary of Remember Patience Whipple, Mayflower, 1620 by Kathryn Lasky (1996)
The Winter of Red Snow: The Revolutionary War Diary of Abigail Jane Stewart, Valley Forge, Pennsylvania, 1777 by Kristiana Gregory (1996)
 When Will This Cruel War Be Over?: The Civil War Diary of Emma Simpson, Gordonsville, Virginia, 1864 by Barry Denenberg (1996)
A Picture of Freedom: The Diary of Clotee, a Slave Girl, Belmont Plantation, Virginia, 1859 by Patricia McKissack (1997)
Across the Wide and Lonesome Prairie: The Oregon Trail Diary of Hattie Campbell, 1847 by Kristiana Gregory (1997)
So Far from Home: The Diary of Mary Driscoll, an Irish Mill Girl, Lowell, Massachusetts, 1847 by Barry Denenberg (1997)
I Thought My Soul Would Rise and Fly: The Diary of Patsy, a Freed Girl, Mars Bluff, South Carolina, 1865 by Joyce Hansen (1997)
West to a Land of Plenty: The Diary of Teresa Angelino Viscardi, New York to Idaho Territory, 1883 by Jim Murphy (1998)
Dreams in the Golden Country: The Diary of Zipporah Feldman, a Jewish Immigrant Girl, New York City, 1903 by Kathryn Lasky (1998)
Standing in the Light: The Captive Diary of Catharine Carey Logan, Delaware Valley, Pennsylvania, 1763 by Mary Pope Osborne (1998)
Voyage on the Great Titanic: The Diary of Margaret Ann Brady, RMS Titanic, 1912 by Ellen Emerson White (1998)
A Line in the Sand: The Alamo Diary of Lucinda Lawrence, Gonzales, Texas, 1836 by Sherry Garland (1998)
My Heart Is on the Ground: The Diary of Nannie Little Rose, a Sioux Girl, Carlisle Indian School, Pennsylvania, 1880 by Ann Rinaldi (1999)
The Great Railroad Race: The Diary of Libby West, Utah Territory, 1868 by Kristiana Gregory (1999)
A Light in the Storm: The Civil War Diary of Amelia Martin, Fenwick Island, Delaware, 1861 by Karen Hesse (1999)
The Girl Who Chased Away Sorrow: The Diary of Sarah Nita, a Navajo Girl, New Mexico, 1864 by Ann Turner (1999)
A Coal Miner's Bride: The Diary of Anetka Kaminska, Lattimer, Pennsylvania, 1896 by Susan Campbell Bartoletti (2000)
Color Me Dark: The Diary of Nellie Lee Love, the Great Migration North, Chicago, Illinois, 1919 by Patricia McKissack (2000)
One Eye Laughing, the Other Weeping: The Diary of Julie Weiss, Vienna, Austria to New York, 1938 by Barry Denenberg (2000)
My Secret War: The World War II Diary of Madeline Beck, Long Island, New York, 1941 by Mary Pope Osborne (2000)
Valley of the Moon: The Diary Of Maria Rosalia de Milagros, Sonoma Valley, Alta California, 1846 by Sherry Garland (2001)
Seeds of Hope: The Gold Rush Diary of Susanna Fairchild, California Territory, 1849 by Kristiana Gregory (2001)
Christmas After All: The Great Depression Diary of Minnie Swift, Indianapolis, Indiana, 1932 by Kathryn Lasky (2001)
Early Sunday Morning: The Pearl Harbor Diary of Amber Billows, Hawaii, 1941 by Barry Denenberg (2001)
My Face to the Wind: The Diary of Sarah Jane Price, a Prairie Teacher, Broken Bow, Nebraska, 1881 by Jim Murphy (2001)
Where Have All the Flowers Gone? The Diary of Molly MacKenzie Flaherty, Boston, Massachusetts, 1968 by Ellen Emerson White (2002)
A Time for Courage: The Suffragette Diary of Kathleen Bowen, Washington, D.C., 1917 by Kathryn Lasky (2002)
Mirror, Mirror on the Wall: The Diary of Bess Brennan, Perkins School for the Blind, 1932 by Barry Denenberg (2002)
Survival in the Storm: The Dust Bowl Diary of Grace Edwards, Dalhart, Texas, 1935 by Katelan Janke (2002)
When Christmas Comes Again: The World War I Diary of Simone Spencer, New York City to the Western Front, 1917 by Beth Seidel Levine (2002)
Land of the Buffalo Bones: The Diary of Mary Ann Elizabeth Rodgers, an English Girl in Minnesota, New Yeovil, Minnesota, 1873 by Marion Dane Bauer (2002)
Love Thy Neighbor: The Tory Diary of Prudence Emerson, Green Marsh, Massachusetts, 1774 by Ann Turner (2003)
All the Stars in the Sky: The Santa Fe Trail Diary of Florrie Mack Ryder, The Santa Fe Trail, 1848 by Megan McDonald (2003)
Look to the Hills: The Diary of Lozette Moreau, a French Slave Girl, New York Colony, 1763 by Patricia McKissack (2004)
I Walk in Dread: The Diary of Deliverance Trembley, Witness to the Salem Witch Trials, Massachusetts Bay Colony, 1691 by Lisa Rowe Fraustino (2004)
Hear My Sorrow: The Diary of Angela Denoto, a Shirtwaist Worker, New York City, 1909 by Deborah Hopkinson (2004)

2010 Re-launch

The Dear America series was relaunched in September 2010 with their first new book since 2004, The Fences Between Us by Kirby Larson, set during World War II, as well as re-releases of earlier books.  New books for 2011 include Like the Willow Tree, Cannons at Dawn (the sequel to The Winter of Red Snow and the first sequel in the series), With the Might of Angels, Behind the Masks, A City Tossed and Broken, and Down the Rabbit Hole. There have also been new editions of several earlier books released in 2011.

Books in the relaunched Dear America series:
A Journey to the New World: The Diary of Remember Patience Whipple, Mayflower, 1620 by Kathryn Lasky (September 2010)
The Winter of Red Snow: The Diary of Abigail Jane Stewart, Valley Forge, Pennsylvania, 1777 by Kristiana Gregory (September 2010)
The Fences Between Us: The Diary of Piper Davis, Seattle, Washington, 1941 by Kirby Larson (September 2010)
Voyage on the Great Titanic: The Diary of Margaret Ann Brady, RMS Titanic, 1912 by Ellen Emerson White (November 2010)
A Picture of Freedom: The Diary of Clotee, a Slave Girl, Belmont Plantation, Virginia, 1859 by Patricia McKissack (January 2011)
Like the Willow Tree: The Diary of Lydia Amelia Pierce, Portland, Maine, 1918 by Lois Lowry (January 2011)
A Light in the Storm: The Diary of Amelia Martin, Fenwick Island, Delaware, 1861 by Karen Hesse (March 2011)
When Will This Cruel War Be Over?: The Diary of Emma Simpson, Gordonsville, Virginia, 1864 by Barry Denenberg (April 2011)
Cannons at Dawn: The Second Diary of Abigail Jane Stewart, Valley Forge, Pennsylvania, 1779 by Kristiana Gregory (May 2011)
Standing in the Light: The Diary of Catharine Carey Logan, Delaware Valley, Pennsylvania, 1763 by Mary Pope Osborne (May 2011)
I Thought My Soul Would Rise and Fly: The Diary of Patsy, a Freed Girl, Mars Bluff, South Carolina, 1865 by Joyce Hansen (July 2011)
With the Might of Angels: The Diary of Dawnie Rae Johnson, Hadley, Virginia, 1954 by Andrea Davis Pinkney (September 2011) 
I Walk in Dread: The Diary of Deliverance Trembley, Witness to the Salem Witch Trials, Massachusetts Bay Colony, 1691 by Lisa Rowe Fraustino (September 2011)
Behind the Masks: The Diary of Angeline Reddy, Bodie, California, 1880 by Susan Patron (January 2012)
Across the Wide and Lonesome Prairie: The Diary of Hattie Campbell, The Oregon Trail, 1847 by Kristiana Gregory (April 2012)
Christmas After All: The Diary of Minnie Swift, Indianapolis, Indiana, 1932 by Kathryn Lasky (September 2012)
A City Tossed and Broken: The Diary of Minnie Bonner, San Francisco, California, 1906 by Judy Blundell (March 2013)
Down the Rabbit Hole: The Diary of Pringle Rose, Chicago, Illinois, 1871 by Susan Campbell Bartoletti (March 2013)
Hear My Sorrow: The Diary of Angela Denoto, a Shirtwaist Worker, New York City, 1909 by Deborah Hopkinson (January 2014)

Spin-offs
Three other book series, like Dear America, were also published by Scholastic:

My Name is America, a series of fictional journals of young men during American history
My America, a series of fictional diaries of young children during American history
The Royal Diaries, a series of fictional journals about the teenage years of famous royal women throughout world history.

Most of the "America" or "Royal" diaries are women and girls experiences.

In addition, several of Scholastic's international divisions have published series inspired by the Dear America series:

Dear Canada, published by Scholastic Canada
I Am Canada, published by Scholastic Canada
My Story published by Scholastic UK. This series re-publishes at least three of the Dear America books: A Journey to the New World (as Mayflower), A Picture of Freedom (as Slave Girl), and Voyage on the Great Titanic.
My Australian Story published by Scholastic Australia
My Story published by Scholastic New Zealand
Dear India and A Princess's Diary published by Scholastic India

Other, Non-Scholastic series, spin-offs include:
Diarios Mexicanos published by Planeta (Spanish only)
Mon Histoire published by Gallimard jeunesse (French only)

References

External links
Scholastic's Dear America website

Series of children's books
Children's historical novels
American children's novels
American historical novels
Fictional diaries